Bridge of Glass (Italian: Il ponte di vetro) is a 1940 Italian drama film directed by Goffredo Alessandrini and starring Isa Pola, Rossano Brazzi and Filippo Scelzo. It was shot at the Scalera Studios in Rome.

Cast
Isa Pola as Luciana Dorelli
Rossano Brazzias  comandante Mario Marchi
Filippo Scelzo as dottor Paolo Dorelli
Regina Bianchi as Anna
Carlo Romano as  Leone
Adriano Rimoldi 
Renato Chiantoni 
Fedele Gentile
Walter Grant
Mario Lodolini
Felice Romano

References

Bibliography 
 Savio, Francesco. Ma l'amore no. Sonzogno, 1975.

External links 
 

1940 films
Italian drama films
1940 drama films
1940s Italian-language films
Films directed by Goffredo Alessandrini
Italian black-and-white films
Films shot at Scalera Studios
1940s Italian films